The 1912 Summer Olympics, officially known as the Games of the V Olympiad, were an international multi-sport event held in Stockholm, Sweden, between 5 May and 27 July 1912. Twenty-eight nations and 2,408 competitors, including 48 women, competed in 102 events in 14 sports.

Medal table

The ranking in this table is based on information provided by the International Olympic Committee (IOC) and is consistent with IOC convention in its published medal tables. By default, the table is ordered by the number of gold medals the athletes from a National Olympic Committee have won (a nation is represented at a Games by the associated National Olympic Committee). The number of silver medals is taken into consideration next and then the number of bronze medals. If NOCs are still tied, equal ranking is given and they are listed alphabetically by IOC country code.

See also

External links
 
 
 
 

Medal count
1912